Soviet First League 1991 was the last season of the Soviet First League. With the collapse of the Soviet Union the football structure was reformed. All of its participants have entered the Top Divisions of the republics of their origin, except of Dinamo Sukhumi that because of the 1992-93 War in Abkhazia was dissolved. 

Due to the 1991 Soviet coup d'état attempt, a process of dissolution of the Soviet Union accelerated as well as a process of decommunization in former union republics. Number of cities changed their names returning to their original names.

Teams

Promoted teams
FC Uralmash Sverdlovsk – Winner of the 1990 Soviet Second League, Zone Center (returning after an absence of 10 seasons)
FC Bukovina Chernovtsy – Winner of the 1990 Soviet Second League, Zone West (debut)
FC Neftianik Fergona – Winner of the 1990 Soviet Second League, Zone East (debut)
FC Novbakhor Namangan – Runner-up of the 1990 Soviet Second League, Zone East (debut)
FC Textilshchik Kamyshin – Runner-up of the 1990 Soviet Second League, Zone Center (debut)
FC Daugava Riga – Runner-up of the 1990 Soviet Second League, Zone West (debut)

Relegated teams 
Rotor Volgograd – (Returning after 2 seasons)

Renamed teams 
Prior to the start of the season Tiras Tiraspol was renamed to Tiligul Tiraspol.
Prior to the start of the season Nistru Kishenev was renamed to Zimbrul Kishinev.

Replaced or withdrawn teams
With fall of the Soviet Union, the promoted FC Daugava Riga was dissolved and replaced with FC Pardaugava Riga that was based on the junior squad of the Latvia national U-21 football team and took part in the 1990 Baltic League placing only 15th out 17 teams.

Locations

League standings
Notes:
 On 6 September 1991, the city of Leningrad was renamed into Saint Petersburg
 On 4 September 1991, the city of Sverdlovsk was renamed into Yekaterinburg

Number of teams by union republic

Top scorers

Managers

See also
 1991 Soviet Top League
 1991 Soviet Second League
 1991 Soviet Second League B

External links
 1990 First League at the RSSSF

Soviet First League seasons
2
Soviet
Soviet
1991 in Abkhazia
1991 in Armenian football
1991 in Kazakhstani football
1991 in Latvian football
1991–92 in Moldovan football
1991 in Russian football leagues
1991 in Ukrainian association football leagues
1991 in Uzbekistani football
1 
1